The PlayStation 4 system software is the updatable firmware and operating system of the PlayStation 4. The operating system is Orbis OS, based on FreeBSD 9.

Technology

System
The native operating system of the PlayStation 4 is Orbis OS, which is a fork of FreeBSD version 9.0 which was released on January 12, 2012.

The PlayStation 4 features two graphics APIs, a low-level API named Gnm and a high-level API named Gnmx.

Most developers start with Gnmx, which wraps around Gnm, and in turn manages the more esoteric GPU details. 
This can be a familiar way to work if the developers are used to platforms like Direct3D 12.

Another key area of the game is its programmable pixel shaders. Sony's own PlayStation Shader Language (PSSL) was introduced to the PlayStation 4.

It has been suggested that the PlayStation Shader Language is very similar to the HLSL standard in DirectX 12, with just subtle differences that could be eliminated mostly through preprocessor macros.

Besides the kernel and related components, other components included and worth mentioning are Cairo, jQuery, Lua, Mono, OpenSSL, WebKit, and the Pixman rendering library.

Many of these are open-source software, although the PlayStation 4 is not an open console.

The Software Development Kit (SDK) is based on LLVM and Clang, which Sony has chosen due to its conformant C and C++ front-ends, C++11 support, compiler optimization and diagnostics.

Graphical shell 
The PlayStation 4 uses the PlayStation Dynamic Menu as its graphical shell, in contrast to the XrossMediaBar (XMB) used by the PlayStation Portable and PlayStation 3, as well as the LiveArea used by the PlayStation Vita and PlayStation TV. It is named "Dynamic Menu" because the options it offers to players are context-sensitive, changing based on what a player is actually doing with their PlayStation 4 at any given time. This makes navigation simpler than the previous iteration. This dynamic menu can alter itself so that there's as little time as possible between the users placing a game in the disc drive and the actual gameplay beginning.

The PlayStation 4's user interface attempts simplicity as a priority. The main place for entertainment options, the Content area, is prominently displayed with large square icons on a horizontal line arranged by the most recently used. Users can scroll through this gamer newsfeed in an alternating, brick-like formation reminiscent of the social media site Pinterest. Many other main objects will display additional information when having the cursor selected on them. A game may have news updates or advertisements for its downloadable content. Recently played games receive tiles along with a number of mandatory items like the Live from PlayStation and the Internet Browser applications. Content icon customization and options on how to sort them would give players a way to mold the display to better suit their needs.

Augmented Reality
The augmented reality application, the Playroom comes pre-installed with the PlayStation 4 console. It was demonstrated at E3 2013 and utilizes the Sony PlayStation Camera technology. According to Sony, it is a "fantastically fresh augmented reality entertainment experience", which has been created by combining the light bar located on the front of DualShock 4 controller with the PlayStation Camera. Players are allowed to produce a small floating robot called Asobi, who interacts with the players, scans their faces and shoots fireballs. Once the PlayStation Camera identifies the player with the help of the light bar on the front, a flick on the touchpad of the DualShock 4 controller brings up the augmented reality Bots function of the PlayRoom, which creates the illusion that there are hundreds of little bots inside the controller, which can be released simply with a tap on the track pad that functions like the PlayStation Vita. PS4 owners can view their smartphone or PlayStation Vita for drawing the object and flick it anywhere for the augmented reality Bots to play with.

Remote Play and second screen

Through Remote Play users can operate their PS4 through the uses of a PlayStation Vita handheld game console, allowing for the play of PS4 games and other media on the small device via streaming. All games that do not require the PlayStation Move or PlayStation Camera are compatible.

The second screen can be used to display unique content when playing games that support this option, but it should not be confused with a split-screen. The second screen may be used to show extra content like maps, alternate camera angles, radar or even playbooks in sports games. Apart from PlayStation Vita, other mobile devices such as iPads or Android tablets can also be used as a second screen. That comes in the form of both the official PlayStation App and game companion apps such as Knack's Quest.

Social features
A heavy emphasis on social features has been placed on the PlayStation 4 console, loading up the PS4 with a number of share-centric apps and features. The [What's New] feature, which allows users to check out their friends' latest activities via a landing page full of their pictures, trophies and other recent events, is an easy way to find out what friends have been up to. On the other hand, a cross-chat feature dubbed [Party Chat] is an interesting way to keep in touch. This gives gamers the ability to chat with other users whether or not they're playing the same title.

The PS4's sharing capabilities adds another layer to console gaming. PS4 owners are able to capture or livestream the gameplay with a simple button touch. They can record up to 60 minutes of their latest gaming exploits with a quick press of the Share button on the controller. Footage can be shared on Facebook, Twitter and YouTube. They also have the ability to broadcast their gameplay in real-time to Twitch and Ustream in addition to recording videos.

There are also other social features such as community creation. Some of them are introduced via system updates. Favorite Groups is a new section within the Friends app, and acts as a way to quickly access other people a user plays with the most. This feature is aimed at making it easier and faster to get into a game session with friends. On the other hand, communities are new hubs that can be formed around shared interests like games, activities, or play styles. There also exist other smaller social features on PS4, such as the ability to message a friend with a request to watch their gameplay live.

Internet features
While the PlayStation 4 console can function without an Internet connection, it provides more functionality when it is connected to the Internet. For example, updates to the system software may be downloaded from the Internet, and users may play online when the Internet is properly connected. Online play is the main pillar for the PlayStation 4, but a PlayStation Plus subscription is required to play the majority of PS4 titles online, unlike PlayStation 3 titles. According to Sony, they are developing many new ways to play and connect for PS4 which requires a large investment of resources. As a result, Sony claim they cannot keep such a service free and maintain its quality at the same time considering the cost, and they thus decided that it would be better to charge a fee in order to continue to offer a good service.

The web browser included in the PlayStation 4 console is based on the open source WebKit layout engine, unlike the PlayStation 3 which uses the NetFront browser. Using the same modern Webkit core as Safari from Apple, the PS4 web browser receives a very high score in HTML5 compliance testing. However, just like other major browsers, it does not support the deprecated Adobe Flash, which means that websites which still require Flash might not display properly or function as intended. Also, the PDF format is not supported. However, one clear advantage for gamers is being able to cut between gaming and browsing and back again with no loss of gameplay due to the multitasking feature of the web browser. Additionally, while the PS4 web browser has limited support for USB keyboards, it does not seem to support USB mice at all.

Furthermore, with Internet connection enabled the PlayStation 4 allows users to access a variety of PlayStation Network (PSN) services, including the PlayStation Store, PlayStation Plus subscription service, and more. Users may download or buy games and other content from these services. Also, gamers are able to play a selection of PS3 titles via the Internet-based PlayStation Now gaming service. PS Now is a cloud-based gaming subscription service from Sony Interactive.

Multimedia features
The PlayStation 4 supports playing standard 12-centimeter DVD-Video discs; DVD recordable and rewritable discs except those that have not been finalized; and standard Blu-ray discs with the exception of Blu-ray Recordable Erasable version 1.0 discs and Blu-ray XL format discs. Unlike all previous PlayStation consoles the system does not support the Compact Disc format at all, including Compact Disc Digital Audio and Video CD format discs. Blu-ray 3D support was added in system software version 1.75. In 2015, Sony partnered with Spotify to bring the music streaming service to the PlayStation 4, allowing music to be streamed in the background of any game or application for both free and premium members of Spotify.

The Media Player application included with the system can be used to play media files on USB storage devices or media servers. According to the PlayStation 4's user guide, media formats supported include  videos contained in the MP4, MKV and AVI formats and encoded in H.264 AVC High Profile 4.2, MPEG4 ASP, MPEG2 Visual, AVCHD, and XAVC S; audio encoded in MP3, FLAC, or AAC; or AC-3 (Dolby Digital) and photos encoded in JPEG, BMP, or PNG. The PlayStation 4 Pro also supports videos encoded in H.264 AVC High Profile 5.2. If users have a PlayStation VR headset connected, they can view 360-degree videos inside the headset.

Backward compatibility

The PlayStation 4 was not backward compatible with any games from previous PlayStation consoles at launch. Though PlayStation 4 users cannot play PlayStation 3 games directly, in 2014, the PlayStation Now cloud-based streaming service allowed for the streaming of selected PS3 games. In December 2015, Sony added PlayStation 2 backward compatibility and republished some PS2 games such as Dark Cloud and Grand Theft Auto III, Grand Theft Auto: Vice City, and Grand Theft Auto: San Andreas on the PS4 via the PlayStation Store in the Americas and Europe. Supported PS2 games run via software emulation (upscaled to high definition) on PS4 systems instead of having been remastered. Each one has been updated to access various PS4 features, including Trophies, Share Play, Broadcasting, Remote Play and second-screen features. However, the original PS2 game discs, and PS2 Classics re-released for the PS3 are not compatible with the PS4 system.

History of updates 
The initial version of the system software for the PlayStation 4 is 1.01 as pre-installed on the original consoles. Support for the Remote Play and second screen experiences were added in version 1.50, which was launched on the same day the PlayStation 4 console itself was released in North America on November 15, 2013. Both features are accessible from the PlayStation Vita console by using its PS4 Link application, and the second screen functionality is also accessible from smartphones and tablets through the PlayStation Mobile app. It is also able to record or share video clips as well as broadcasting gameplay to Twitch or Ustream. It supports Blu-ray and DVD-Video playback, and version 1.60 was released on February 4, 2014, improving DVD playback. Version 1.60 also adds support for Pulse Elite wireless headsets. Version 1.70 was released on April 30, 2014, and adds a number of new features, such as the addition of a rich video editor called ShareFactory that offers users the tools to combine, edit and personalize captured video clips. This update also adds the abilities to share video clips and screenshots while streaming, and to copy video clips and screenshots to USB storage. Version 1.75 was released on July 29, 2014, further adding the support for playback of Blu-ray 3D. It also improves the sound quality during 1.5-speed playback with Blu-ray and DVD video.

On September 2, 2014, Sony released update 1.76 which came with minor changes and was the last update until 2.0.

On October 28, 2014, Sony released update 2.00 as a major upgrade to the PlayStation 4 system software. Among the features introduced is Share Play, which allows PlayStation Plus users to invite an online friend to join their play session via streaming, even if they do not own a copy of the game. Users can pass control of the game entirely to the remote user, or partake in cooperative multiplayer as if they were physically present. This version also adds a YouTube app and the ability to upload video clips to YouTube, and users can now play music stored on USB storage devices. Also, with the support for custom themes and the ability to change the background color, users can set themes for home screens and function screens for each user in this version.

On March 26, 2015, Sony released update 2.50, adding a suspend/resume feature to allow players to jump in and out of games with the PS button, and games are suspended in the low-power Rest Mode instead of closing completely.

This version also allows the console's hard drive to be backed up or restored to a USB flash drive.

On September 30, 2015, Sony released update 3.00. It introduced "entirely new features" and user-interface enhancements. Among the new features was the ability to share videos directly to Twitter, a dedicated PlayStation Plus section, tweaks to the interface for streaming on YouTube, improvements to social features such as messages and group creation, and the ability to save screenshots as PNGs. An increase in online storage capacity from 1 GB to 10 GB was also introduced for PlayStation Plus Members. 
Sony states that this update will create "new ways to connect with friends and players around the world, expanding the social capabilities of the system even further".

On April 6, 2016, Sony released update 3.50, that would enable the PS4 to use Remote Play functionality on Windows and macOS (formerly named OS X). VG247 reported that the update will allow Remote Play functionality on computers running Windows 8.1, Windows 10, OS X Yosemite, and OS X El Capitan. Furthermore, the article explains that Remote Play will support resolution options of 360p, 540p, and 720p, frame rate options of 30 FPS and 60 FPS, and that one DualShock 4 controller can be connected via the computer's USB port.

On September 13, 2016, Sony released update 4.00, which added High Dynamic Range (HDR) and home screen folder support, 1080p streaming, tweaks to menus and game info screens for greater overview, and streamlined interfaces.

On March 9, 2017, Sony released update 4.50 including support for installing applications on external hard drives, custom wallpapers, refined Quick Menu, simplified notifications list, custom status updates, 3D Blu-Ray support for the PlayStation VR

and support for the preloading of game patches. However it is up to the developer to make use of it. The first game to take advantage of pre loading game patches is LittleBigPlanet 3.

On October 3, 2017, Sony released update 5.00. Overhauling the master/sub-account system, the update allows for more customization of accounts for family members and roles, and applying parental controls to each account. The groups system is replaced with a new friends management system, along with support for 5.1 and 7.1 surround sound configurations for PlayStation VR. A new tournament bracket viewer has been made, along with tweaks to broadcasting (with 1080p streaming at 60 frames per second on Twitch now possible), and other changes to PS Message, notifications, and the quick menu. Lastly, it introduces localization for Czech, Greek, Hungarian, Indonesian, Romanian, Thai, and Vietnamese languages.

5.50 was released on March 8, 2018. It includes playtime restrictions for child accounts, the ability to hide applications from the library, custom wallpapers via USB, a supersampling mode on PS4 Pro and the ability to delete notifications.

On March 7, 2019, Sony released Update 6.50 that allowed users to use Remote Play on iOS devices through the Remote Play app from the App Store, and other minor improvements.

On May 10, 2019, Sony Interactive Entertainment added the ability to remove purchased games from the Download List for PlayStation Store and delete games from My Profile.

On October 8, 2019, Sony released update 7.00. The major feature that was added was the ability to use Remote Play on select Android devices running the Android Lollipop version and above. In addition, other features include chat transcription and the expanded limit for party users from 8 to 16.

On October 14, 2020, Sony released update 8.00. It brought changes to existing Party and Message features. Other additions include new avatars, enhanced 2-step verification system and updated parental controls.

On April 14, 2021, Sony released update 8.50, which enabled cross-play between the PlayStation 4 and PlayStation 5. They also added the feature to request to join game session leaders, and more.

On September 15, 2021, Sony released update 9.00 allowing PlayStation 4 users to access PlayStation 5 trophies, improvements to parental controls and messages feature. This update also fixed the eventual cbomb issue discovered by Destruction Games that would cause PlayStation 4's to no longer be able to play physical or digital games. Controversially, it has caused serious issues for some.

On February 19, 2022, Sony released update 9.04 which claimed to have "improved system performance." and fixed issues with the game Cyberpunk 2077.

On March 23, 2022, Sony released update 9.50 with Party Feature updates and Ukrainian language support.

On September 7, 2022, Sony released update 10.00 improving Remote Play and other features.

See also 

Other gaming platforms from Sony:
 PlayStation 3 system software
 PlayStation Vita system software
 PlayStation Portable system software

Other gaming platforms from this generation:
 Wii U system software
 Xbox One system software
 Nintendo 3DS system software
 Nintendo Switch system software

Other gaming platforms from the seventh generation:
 Wii system software
 Xbox 360 system software
 Nintendo DSi system software

References 

Software
 
Game console operating systems
2013 software
Proprietary operating systems
Unix variants

de:PlayStation 4#Betriebssysteme